Julie Enfield Investigates is a series of British radio dramas originally broadcast on BBC Radio 4 between 1994 and 1999. Written by Nick Fisher and starring Imelda Staunton as DSI Enfield, there were five stories: Terminus (1994), The Smithfield Murders (1995), The Net And The Canal (1996), The Leaves Of The Dead (1997) and Murder West One (1999).

The first four runs were serials of four or five 30 minute episodes. Murder West One consists of four self-contained 45-minute cases. As an initial one-off, Terminus didn't carry the 'Julie Enfield Investigates' prefix.
Trademarks running through all the stories are a very dark, almost Gothic, sense of horror, and an unusual narrator (in the case of Terminus, the railway station in which the murders take place). The Smithfield Murders begins with an adapted quotation from Oliver Twist: "Filth and fat, and blood and foam. Unwashed unshaven squalid figures move to and fro, among the steam that rises from the reeking bodies, mingling with the fog that seemed to rest upon the chimney tops, hung heavily above."  The series is occasionally repeated on BBC Radio 4 Extra.

Episode lists

References

External links
RadioListings episode guide

BBC Radio 4 programmes
1994 radio programme debuts
J